The 2006–07 EHF Women's Cup Winner's Cup was the 31st season of the tournament organised by EHF.

The final was played between Oltchim Râmnicu Vâlcea and Byåsen Trondheim. Oltchim defeated Byåsen 59–53 and have earned the right to play in the EHF Champions Trophy in Romania.

Top goalscorers

References

 

Women's EHF Cup Winners' Cup
EHF Cup Winners' Cup Women
EHF Cup Winners' Cup Women